Kisaleh may refer to:
 Kisaleh, Salas-e Babajani